Trine! is a Norwegian black-and-white drama film from 1952 directed by Toralf Sandø. Eva Røine starred in the title role. The film was based on Hans Geelmuyden's novel Trine!, and Geelmuyden wrote the script for the film together with Sandø.

Plot
Per Gjerpen works as a salesman and accountant. One day he sees Trine while he is out on a sales tour. He buys her two lottery tickets. This is the beginning of a contact that later deepens into a love affair. The couple discovers that they have won a house in the lottery, but it later turns out not to be true. The numbers were read incorrectly. Instead, they are able to use a house owned by Aunt Andrea. Trine goes to visit Andrea, who is ill, and Per grows lonely in the house. Then complications begin.

Cast

 Eva Røine as Trine
 Frank Robert as Per Gjerpen
 Jørn Ording as Jens Gulbrandsen
 Christina Lundquist as Effi May Palmer
 Margit Brataas as Gurine
 Erna Schøyen as Mrs. Hatlezet, Trine's mother
 Sigrun Otto as Mrs. Jahnfeldt, Jens's mother
 Liv Uchermann Selmer as Aunt Andrea
 Brita Bigum as Miss Svingvoll
 Mona Hofland as Miss Jørgensen 
 Sigurd Magnussøn as Pandahl, an auditor
 Ulf Selmer as Uncle Joachim 
 Alf Malland as a policeman
 Aasta Voss		
 Edel Stenberg 		
 Torhild Lindal	
 Jan Voigt 		
 Øivind Johnssen	
 Rolf Just Nilsen
 Oscar Amundsen		
 Karin Hox
 Harald Aimarsen

References

External links
 
 Trine! at the National Library of Norway

1952 drama films
Norwegian drama films
Norwegian black-and-white films
1950s Norwegian-language films
Films directed by Toralf Sandø